is a former Japanese football player. He is the current senior striker coach Japan Football League club of Briobecca Urayasu.

Playing career
Hasegawa was born in Adachi, Tokyo on August 17, 1979. He joined J1 League club Kashiwa Reysol from youth team in 1998. On March 28, he debuted against Consadole Sapporo. In 1999, he played often and the club won the championship in the J.League Cup. However he did not play much after 2000. In 2002, he moved to the J2 League club Albirex Niigata. However he did not play much there, either. In 2003, he moved to the J2 club Ventforet Kofu. Although he did not play much until 2004, he played all matches as left winger and scored 17 goals. The club also won third place and was promoted to J1 in 2006. However he did not play much in 2006. In August 2007, he moved to the J2 club Tokushima Vortis. He played all matches as regular player. In 2008, he moved to the J2 club Yokohama FC. However he did not play much. In 2009, he moved to the Japan Football League club New Wave Kitakyushu (later Giravanz Kitakyushu). He played as a regular player and the club was promoted to J2 in 2010. In 2011, he moved to Urayasu SC. In 2014, he move to the Indian club Mohammedan. He retired in December 2014.

Club statistics

References

External links

1979 births
Living people
Association football people from Tokyo
Japanese footballers
J1 League players
J2 League players
Japan Football League players
I-League players
Kashiwa Reysol players
Albirex Niigata players
Ventforet Kofu players
Tokushima Vortis players
Yokohama FC players
Giravanz Kitakyushu players
Briobecca Urayasu players
Mohammedan SC (Kolkata) players
Japanese expatriate sportspeople in India
Expatriate footballers in India
Association football forwards